Below there are the squads from the participating teams of the 2011 Women's European Volleyball League.

Head Coach: Viktar Hancharou

Head Coach: Dragutin Baltic

Head Coach: Irina Kirillova

Head Coach: Jiri Siller

Head Coach: Fabrice Vial

Head Coach: Dimitrios Floros

Head Coach: Zoltán Jókay

Head Coach: Arie Selinger

Head Coach: Darko Zakoc

Head Coach: Gido Vermeulen

Head Coach: Zoran Terzić

Head Coach: Marco Aurélio Motta

References

2011 in volleyball
European Volleyball League women's squads